Ciemno-Gnojna  is a village in the administrative district of Gmina Mszczonów, within Żyrardów County, Masovian Voivodeship, in east-central Poland.

References

Ciemno-Gnojna